Pelendri is a village in the Limassol District of Cyprus.

Location 
Pelendri is located below the Troodos Mountains, in the region of Pitsilia. It is located on a barren hillside, at an altitude of 800 meters above sea level, 40 kilometers from the city of Limassol. Adjacent to the Trimiklini villages Saittas, Potamitissa and Amiandos.

Physical geography

Geology 
The terrain is rugged and mountainous with narrow deep valleys and steep slopes. On three sides of the village loom tall peaks, their height in many cases exceeding 1000 metres.

Climate, flora and vegetation 
The climate of the region combined with the relatively high annual rainfall received by the village (about 750 millimetres) favours the cultivation of various fruit trees (apple, peach, pear), grapevines, olive, almond, nuts, raspberries and vegetables (green beans, peas, tomatoes, cucumbers, onions, zucchini, potatoes).

However, due to the relief of the area there are several uncultivated areas with a rich presence of natural vegetation. Here there are a variety of plants: πεύκων, λατζιές, αντρουκλιές, τρεμιθιές, ξυσταριές, περνιές, αγριοελιές, σκλήδρους, πλατάνους, μερσινιές. Part of the Troodos and Monastery state forests  are within the administrative boundaries of Pelendri.

History 
Pelendri was a well-known settlement during the Middle Ages. Louis de Mas Latrie refers to it as Pelendres or Pelondres. He also says that in 1353 it was a fief of John de Lusignan, Prince of Antioch and a member of the royal family of Cyprus. The medieval chronicler Georgios Boustronios mentioned the village twice in his chronicle. In one case he mentions that in around 1461, a rich trader named Satin lived in the village. In the second, he speaks of two Prastio (farms) in Pelendri owned by Ritzzo di Marino. They were seized in 1474 by Catherine Cornaro. These two farms, Kardamas (Kardama) and Filagra, were dissolved during the Ottoman occupation. Filagra was re-established in the mid 20th century.

The church of 'Timios Stavros' was built in the 14th century and is one of the best preserved Byzantine churches in Cyprus. It, along with 9 other Painted Churches in the Troödos Region were inscribed as a UNESCO World Heritage Site in 1985 because of their outstanding frescoes and testimony to the history of Byzantine rule in Cyprus.

According to narratives, there were still 14 small villages in the area. They were abandoned, their residents joining with those of Pelendri for security. As such villages reads: Poulos, in which many important archaeological artefacts of the era of Alexander the Great were found, Fournia, in which there are traces of old settlement, Troumithos, in which there is a very old chalcopyrite mine, the Tzeramis, which was completely destroyed by a landslide, Rontia, Konnara, Kaminia, Mazokampos, Chalazin, Argyrou, Deisis, Ais Giannis Potamoulion, Pontikia and Kountouries.

Population history

References

Communities in Limassol District